Sirope Tour is a concert tour by Spanish singer Alejandro Sanz as promoting his album Sirope.

History

The tour will officially begin in Spain for the following cities: Córdoba, Algeciras, Roquetas de Mar, Gijón, A Coruña, Ibiza, Palma de Mallorca, Cambrils, Palafrugell, Marbella, Benidorm, Palencia, Murcia, Valencia, Albacete, Madrid, Barcelona, Bilbao, Málaga, Granada and Sevilla for a total of 25 concerts.

Setlist

Tour dates

Band 
 Mike Ciro - Musical Director and Guitar
 Alfonso Pérez - Piano, Keyboards and Vocal
 Nathaniel Townsley - Drums
 Bri (Brigitte) Sosa - Bass
 Sara Devine - Vocal
 Crystal "Rovel" Torres - Trumpet
Glenda del E - Piano and Vocal
 Freddy "Fuego" González- Trombone
 Victor Mirallas - Saxophone and Clarinet

References

External links 
 Web Oficial Alejandro Sanz.

2015 concert tours
2016 concert tours
Alejandro Sanz